Route 228 is a two-lane east/west provincial highway in Quebec, Canada, which starts at the junction of Route 281 in Saint-Raphaël and ends in Montmagny at the junction of Route 132.

Municipalities along Route 228
 Saint-Raphaël
 Saint-Vallier
 Saint-Pierre-de-la-Rivière-du-Sud
 Saint-François-de-la-Rivière-du-Sud
 Montmagny

See also
 List of Quebec provincial highways

References

External links 
 Provincial Route Map (Courtesy of the Quebec Ministry of Transportation) 
 Route 228 on Google Maps

228
Roads in Chaudière-Appalaches